The Ottoman Empire conquered the Habesh (mostly covering the coastline of present-day Eritrea) starting in 1557, when Özdemir Pasha took the port city of Massawa and the adjacent city of Arqiqo, even taking Debarwa, then capital of the local ruler Bahr negus Yeshaq (ruler of Midri Bahri). They administered this area as the province of Habesh. Yeshaq sought the assistance of emperor Gelawdewos, reinforced by a large Abyssinian army, he recaptured Debarwa, taking all the gold the invaders had piled within. In 1560 Yeshaq, disillusioned with the new Emperor of Ethiopia, revolted with Ottoman support but pledged his support again with the crowning of Emperor Sarsa Dengel. However, not long after, Yeshaq revolted once again with Ottoman support but was defeated once and for all in 1578, Kifle was the king of Massawa, leaving the Ottomans with domain over Massawa, Arqiqo, and some of the nearby coastal environs, which were soon transferred to the control of Beja Na'ibs (deputies).

Background
The proclamation of the eyalet of Habesh in 1554 (although conquest of the territories did not begin until 1557), was preceded by several generations of conflict between the Ottomans, who had been primarily concerned themselves with Anatolia and Eastern Europe, and the Portuguese, who were the major power in the Red Sea and the Indian Ocean. The Ottoman conquest of Egypt in 1517 brought the two powers into direct conflict. In an attempt to monopolize the spice trade from Asia to Europe, the Portuguese, led by the newly appointed Governor Afonso de Albuquerque, "blockad[ed] the entrance to the Red Sea and the [Persian] Gulf", and made an unsuccessful attempt to capture Hormuz.

The spice trade had existed in the early 16th century before the Ottoman conquests of the Muslim states, but Portugal was able to do it around Africa to Western Europe. Despite Ottoman control of Egypt, Portugal continued to rule the seas for a number of decades; not until the Ottoman conquest of Aden in 1538 did the Portuguese grip begin to loosen, which led to direct conflict between the two powers, and a revival of the Red Sea spice trade, allowing the Ottomans to influence the Red Sea.

The first clash between the Ottomans and Portuguese came in 1538, when the beylerbey of Egypt, Süleyman Pasha, was given 74 ships with 3000 men and big guns and charged with taking Portugal-held Diu in India. This first attack failed, but Ottoman forces under Süleyman Pasha were able to win a decisive victory at Aden later that year in the largest naval attempt by the Ottomans in the war. Aden, located in Yemen on the Indian Ocean, was and still is a major port in the region for transshipment of goods destined for the Levant and the Red Sea; the Ottoman capture was a major blow to the Portuguese blockade. Later attacks by both the Ottomans and Portuguese failed to achieve any advantage; not until 1552 were the Ottomans able to launch a second large campaign, when they attempted to seize Hormuz with 25 galleys, 4 galleons, and 850 men, but were ultimately defeated.

Both sides struggled under the weight of this war, which was carried out over such a great area (and strained tiny Portugal's resources), resulting in the end of large-scale campaigning. The final, and perhaps only, "serious naval confrontation in the Indian Ocean" took place in 1554. The next year the Lahsa (al-Hasa) and Habesh eyalets were proclaimed, with Özdemir Pasha assigned the task of conquering Habesh.

The Ottoman activities in Ethiopia proper preceded their invasion. They had supported the campaign of Ahmad Gragn (which had begun in 1527) who was an Ottoman vassal and conquered Ethiopia with 200 Turkish arquebusiers. Following the Imam's reverse after the Battle of Jarta in 1542 they had sent him badly needed aid in the form of matchlockmen sent to Adal at a time when firearms in the region were rare: 10 cannons with artillery men, as well as many as 900 gunmen in 1542. This support led to the destruction of almost all the Portuguese force under Christopher da Gama, and had Ahmad Gragn not dismissed these reinforcements soon afterwards, their help might have helped him to prevail at the decisive Battle of Wayna Daga.

Conquest
The Ottomans invaded the Kingdom of Medri Bahri, now modern-day Eritrea, in 1557 with a force of perhaps 1400-1500 under Özdemir Pasha. First, they captured Massawa, Hirgigo and Beylul then moved inland and captured the regional capital of Debarwa from the Abyssinian Kingdom, he built masjids, a large mosque, and "established a fort [...] with 'a long wall and very high tower... filled with vases of gold and silver, precious stones", and other valuables that were obtained by looting, extractions on trade, and the imposition of a poll tax on the local population. Ozdemir Pasha had also captured the northern and north-west parts of Ethiopia. A fort was also constructed at Hergigo; a planned fort at Massawa had to be abandoned due to a lack of suitable building materials. Debarwa was then given to the local noble Ga'éwah, the sister of Ahmed Gragn's mother-in-law. According to Cengiz Orhonlu, Debarwa was intended to be the "base of penetration of [...] Ethiopia", but had to be abandoned for several reasons. Most important were that the invading force had run out of provisions, and the water cisterns that they had dug had dried up. Lastly, the local population, who "were beginning to have access to fire-arms" put up fierce resistance. As a result, the Ottoman forces abandoned the fort and retreated to Massawa, but was attacked and defeated by the local peasants who "captured all their goods".

The Ottomans at this point made a change in tactics, opting to pit Ethiopian rulers against each other in order to achieve their conquest, rather than invading unilaterally. They had employed this same tactic earlier in the Balkans: absorbing local entities through local rulers due to a shortage of manpower (here because of its peripheral nature and problems with the Safavids and in the Mediterranean) rather than direct conquest. The Bahr negash Yeshaq had bad relations with Emperor Menas, who had just assumed the throne, so in 1561 he revolted against Menas, but the following year he was defeated in battle. Yeshaq then fled to the Ottomans and promised to cede them Debarwa, Massawa, Arqiqo, and all the land in between in return for their help. In 1562 Osman Pasha was defeated by Menas in Enderta in the Tigray region. Yeshaq and the Emperor later made peace, and the Ottomans withdrew from Debarwa in 1572, which Yeshaq quickly occupied, but he returned it to the Ottomans as a result of the earlier agreement.

Sarsa Dengel, Menas' successor as Emperor, was angered by this and campaigned against Yeshaq in 1576, defeating an alliance of the Ottomans, the Bahr negash, and the Emir of Harar in 1579, killing their leaders. The victorious Emperor then advanced on Debarwa whereupon the Turkish garrison surrendered with all its firearms. Sarsa Dengel then seized the vast riches stored by the Turks in Debarwa and ordered the destruction of the mosque and the fort that was erected during the Ottoman occupation. According to Ottoman sources, the Ethiopians then took Arqiqo and managed to destroy Massawa's fort as well as kill 40 of its 100 defenders, though it failed to take the city. As a result, 100 musketeers and 100 cavalrymen were sent to Massawa from Egypt. Given Debarwa's importance as a staging point for the conquest of the rest of Ethiopia, further Ottoman advances on the city were inevitable. Massawa was reinforced by 300 musketeers, 100 cavalry, 10 canonneers, 10 large guns, and 5 builders to repair the fort, all from Egypt. Again employing their earlier tactic of fighting with local leaders, the Ottomans appointed a man named Wad Ezum as Bahr nagash, and in 1588 moved inland where they were defeated by a local lord. Emperor Sarsa Dengel was alarmed by the Ottoman expansion, and replied with an attack on Hergigo in 1589 which failed to capture the fort.

End of expansion
Though pivotal to the control of the Red Sea, Habesh as a whole was less important than the Mediterranean or Eastern border with the Persian Safavids. After the death of Ozdemir Pasa, much of the Ottoman conquests were reversed, and the Yemeni revolt in 1569 - 70 further reduced the importance of Habesh.
Recognizing the difficulty of expanding its territories and the minimal gain from success, in 1591 Habesh was put under the jurisdiction of a local Beja Na'ib, or deputy, who was to pay an annual tribute to the Ottomans, with a small Ottoman garrison left in Massawa.

Further relations between the Ethiopian emperor and the Ottoman Na'ib were marked by periods of relative peace and others of confrontation. The first major conflict came in 1615, in the reign of the Portuguese-influenced (he would later convert to Roman Catholicism) Ethiopian Emperor Susenyos. During the reign of the Na'ibs, Ottoman raiding parties from the garrison at Massawa would periodically raid the surrounding hinterland for cattle, slaves, and other booty. One such raid was defeated, which angered the Pasha of Massawa, who decided to impound goods at the port meant for the Emperor until 62 muskets taken from his men were returned. As a result, Susenyos ordered the governor of a northern province to cut the Na'ib off from Ethiopian supplies, as the eyalet of Habesh had no supplies of its own. Though the Pasha told his men to acquiesce in case of such an event before leaving on a hajj, he was replaced by another Pasha who was unyielding. Susenyos later commented that if he wished to retake Arqiqo, he could do it quickly, but could not hold it against retaliatory Ottoman assaults.

Despite the relative weakness of the Na'ib and Ottoman garrison in the province, the threat of real Ottoman presence and attack kept the territory safe from attack. Even with the weakness of the Ottoman garrison, attacks continued with a number of soldiers and Arabs raiding the countryside for cattle in 1624; this raid was defeated, and its weapons (many firearms and scimitars) were captured and used against the fort at Hergigo. Susenyos then once again prevented caravans from supplying the ports in order to get more favorable terms in any future treaty.

Peace and later relations
A peace treaty was finally brokered in which goods for the Emperor and the Ethiopian Church would be exempted from taxes, imperial agents and Jesuits had free travel, and the Ottomans would only purchase slaves by the Ottomans brought to the port by caravan; the treaty was to be honored by the successors of the rulers as well and contained provisions for breaking the treaty. As a result of the peace and Ottomans' technological superiority, Massawa, with its Ottoman garrison, was not fortified, while Hergigo was defended by a fortress guarded by artillery.

Relations under Susenyos's successor, Fasilides, were markedly better. Susenyos's conversion to Catholicism had resulted in a backlash against the Catholic Portuguese. Fasilides expelled or killed all Jesuits, burned their books, and in 1648 made agreements with the Pashas of Massawa and Suakin to execute any Jesuits attempting to enter Ethiopia through those ports. There was little change in the relatively good (though obviously tense due to contrary intentions) relations until the reign of Iyasu I at the end of the 17th century. The Na'ib seized gifts intended for the Emperor because of their high value, and attempted to levy a tax on them. Refusing to pay, Iyasu banned a northern province from supplying Habesh with food on pain of death. The Na'ib was forced to give back the goods, supplemented with rugs in order to prevent famine in Habesh. In later interactions in the mid-18th century, the Na'ib would prevail over Iyasu II through his threat of killing Ethiopian clergy impounded in Massawa as a retaliation for cutting off food.

See also

Indian Ocean campaigns
Habesh Eyalet

Notes

References

 

History of Eritrea
History of Ethiopia
Wars involving the Ottoman Empire